Leo Joseph Trich, Jr. (born July 23, 1951) is a former Democratic member of the Pennsylvania House of Representatives.

He is a 1969 graduate of Washington High School. He attended California University of Pennsylvania and Washington and Jefferson College.  Prior to elective office, he served as Commissioner of PONY Baseball the Washington, Pennsylvania-based international youth baseball program, where he worked from 1971 thru 1986. He also served as Vice President of the USA Baseball1978-1986 and as a member of the United States Olympic Committee 1980–1985. Trich served a member of baseball's organizing committee, which earned him a position on that sport's task force at the 1984 Olympic Games held in Los Angeles, CA. Trich later served as United States representative for the International Baseball Federation (IBAF). In 1989, then IBAF President Dr. Robert Smith, offered Trich the Executive Director's position with the international baseball organization, but Trich declined, opting instead to pursue a career in government.
  
At age 24, he was the youngest person to be elected and become a member of the Washington City Council from 1976 through 1980. Trich worked in County Government as an assistant to the County Commissioners (1987–88) and then was appointed by PA Governor Robert P. Casey as District Administrator for the Pennsylvania Department of Revenue in 1988. He was first elected to represent the 47th legislative district in the Pennsylvania House of Representatives in 1988. After serving seven terms, he retired prior to the 2002 election.

Following his political career, Trich returned to sports. While in his last term as a State Representative, he founded Ballpark Scholarships Inc, a non-profit volunteer organization that raised money and spearheaded the building of a $7 million minor league ballpark (Falconi Field - now known as Consol Energy Park). Trich is considered the person most responsible for developing this sports venue and bringing minor league professional baseball back to his hometown of Washington, PA.

From 2003 thru 2007, Trich served as the Director of Development with the Frontier Professional Baseball League. In 2008 he joined five others including Dr. Chris Hanners and formed a new summer collegiate baseball program known as the Prospect College League. In 2009 and 2010 he served as the General Manager and majority owner of the Butler BlueSox, a summer collegiate team in the Prospect League. In 2002, he was inducted into the Washington-Greene County Chapter of the Pennsylvania Sports Hall of Fame. From 2004 to the present, Trich continues to work as a consultant. His area of expertise includes sports, government relations and land development. His clients have included: The Frontier Professional Baseball League, the Washington Wild Things professional baseball team, the Prospect Summer College Baseball League, Goodwill Industries of Southwestern Pennsylvania, United Washington Associates and the Chuck Tanner Awards Banquet (Rotary Club of Pittsburgh PA).

In 2019 Trich took part in two World Affairs Council of Pittsburgh events, including one he organized and hosted for area high school seniors at Robert Morris University. The project encouraged activism in both school and community, as well as consideration for careers in public service.  In 2020, Trich was invited to take part in a Trans-Atlantic Goodwill project, representing Pennsylvania as a former state elected official. The event sponsored in  cooperation with the EU Parliament and a national association of state legislators, was postponed in May 2020, because of the Coovid-19 pandemic. Trich attended, when it was rescheduled and took place in Brussels Belgium and the Netherlands, in August 2021.

Awards/Recognitions: 2017- Honored by the Washington County (PA) Historical Society, being inducted into their Hall of Fame;  Inducted in 2003, into the Washington-Greene County Chapter of the Pennsylvania Sport Hall of Fame;  1992 - Selected to attend Harvard's John F. Kennedy School of Government Leadership Summer Semester Program. Trich was one of 50 selected (one from each state legislature) representing the PA House of Representatives ; 1986 - Honored by PONY Baseball, being named to that international youth sports organization's Wall of Fame.

References

External links
 official PA House profile
 official Party website

Living people
Washington & Jefferson College alumni
Democratic Party members of the Pennsylvania House of Representatives
1951 births
20th-century American politicians
21st-century American politicians
Pennsylvania city council members